The Barber Dodge Pro Series was a professional open-wheel auto racing series from 1986 to 2003. It was one of the first professional spec series for open-wheel racecars in North America.  The races were primarily on road and street courses in North America, although the schedule did sometimes include a few ovals.

This series is often confused with Skip Barber's long-standing amateur racing series which has always used different and significantly less powerful cars.  The amateur series currently has regional and national components.

The Barber Pro Series was a spec series, in which all cars were identically prepared by Skip Barber Racing. From its beginning in 1986 to 1994, the series was known as the Barber Saab Pro Series; the spec car was a tube-frame Mondiale chassis (basically a Formula Ford 2000 design) powered by a turbocharged 16-valve Saab 16v engine. For the seasons 1986 and 1987, the cars used street-legal racing tires, but for the 1988 season they used Goodyear Racing Eagle slicks instead.

History

The idea was discussed as early as 1979 as a way to get Saab involved in serious motorsports in the United States. Len Lonnegren, PR boss at Saab Cars USA, had heard that Skip Barber was planning to launch an open-wheel "spec car" professional race series, and that it was to run on the same IMSA programs as the GTPs and Camel Lights. Originally Barber had planned on using small displacement naturally aspirated 1,600 cc Dodge engines, but was talked into using turbocharged Saab engines instead. Saab provided engines and spare parts, as well as the assistance of an engineer nicknamed "Turbo Anders" who flew over from Sweden rather frequently once things got rolling. The engines were basically stock 1,985 cc 16-valve twin-cam turbo engines with an output of 225 hp. The engines differed from street versions in that the boost was increased, emission control systems were removed, fuel-injection settings revised and a racing exhaust fitted, together with dry-sump lubrication. Mondiale, based in Northern Ireland was contracted to supply the series with chassis. The first race was run at Meadowlands and was won by Brian Till. By 1991 the marketing strategy at Saab changed and Saab USA did little more than provide the engines.

In 1995, the Saab engine was replaced with a production car 240 hp 3.2 L 24-valve Dodge aluminum sixty degree V6 engine and the series name was changed to the "Barber Dodge Pro Series". The series continued to use the original tube frame Mondiale chassis. In later years, the engines produced 265 hp. SCCA Pro Racing took over the organisation from IMSA. The first Dodge powered race was won by Geoff Boss. In 1997 it was announced that Reynard would design and build a new car for the Barber Dodge Pro Series. The Mondiale chassis was retired after twelve years of racing in 1998. 
The organisation was taken over by Professional Sports Car Racing. PSCR was formed by Andy Evans and Roberto Muller after they bought IMSA. For 2002, after CART took over the series, the Skip Barber Challenge was launched. This series comprised three race-weekends. The series was run by the Skip Barber Racing School but used the same cars as the pro series. Both seasons were won by Matt Franc. After the CART organisation filed for bankruptcy in early 2004 the Barber Dodge Pro Series was initially put on hiatus.  The assets were transferred to Open Wheel Racing Series, LLC who decided not to run a 2004 Barber Dodge Pro Series. As a result, the Skip Barber Racing school decided to focus on the Skip Barber National Championship.

Statistics

Car

Mondiale
Mondiale Car Company was contracted to build cars for the Skip Barber Racing School and the Barber Saab Pro Series. The Pro series car was based on the Formula Ford 2000 chassis Mondiale had experience with. The chassis was a spaceframe design. The powerplant came of the Saab 900 and Saab 9000 production car.

Reynard
Reynard launched the Reynard 98E for the 1998 Barber Dodge Pro Series. This car featured a carbon fiber monocoque. The engine came from the second generation Dodge Intrepid. The suspension, brakes and radiators were made by Chrysler. The bodywork was designed using computer-aided drafting (CAD). The car was designed by Andrew Thorby and Adrian Reynard. The car was initially tested at Mallory Park and Snetterton by Rob Wilson. In the USA testing was conducted by Robbie Buhl.

Series champions

Other notable drivers who have raced in the series include Juan Pablo Montoya, Alex Gurney, Jon Fogarty, Ryan Hunter-Reay, Danica Patrick, Jeremy Dale, Townsend Bell, Michael Valiante, David Martínez, Memo Rojas, Rocky Moran, Jr., Al Unser III, Andy Swett, Jerry Nadeau, and Ernesto Viso.

References

Formula racing
Saab
Dodge
One-make series